Yordan Lesov (born 19 December 1959) is a Bulgarian boxer. He competed in the men's lightweight event at the 1980 Summer Olympics.

References

External links
 

1959 births
Living people
Bulgarian male boxers
Olympic boxers of Bulgaria
Boxers at the 1980 Summer Olympics
Place of birth missing (living people)
Lightweight boxers
20th-century Bulgarian people